Alagogshak is a stratovolcano, located on the Alaska Peninsula, United States, in Katmai National Park and Preserve. It is the oldest of the volcanoes in the vicinity of the Valley of Ten Thousand Smokes. The volcano was recognized as a separate feature from Mount Martin in 1997. Alagogshak was last active in Pleistocene time, and was active from about 680,000 years ago to about 43,000 years ago. The remnant summit crater consists of hydrothermally altered rock. It is the only member of the Katmai volcanic group that is no longer active.

See also
 List of volcanoes in the United States of America

References

External links
 Alagogshak at the Alaska Volcano Observtory
 Alagogshak Volcano: A Pleistocene Andesite-Dacite Stratovolcano in Katmai National Park 

Stratovolcanoes of the United States
Mountains of Alaska
Volcanoes of Alaska
Volcanoes of Lake and Peninsula Borough, Alaska
Mountains of Lake and Peninsula Borough, Alaska
Aleutian Range
Katmai National Park and Preserve
Pleistocene stratovolcanoes